The Second Battle of Ugentana, was a military operation that took place in 1536, between Portuguese forces and those of sultan Alauddin Riayat Shah II of Johor.

The Battle
In 1535, the Portuguese captain of Malacca Dom Estevão da Gama attempted to decisively defeat the sultan of Johor by attacking his capital at Ugentana. Although he burned the city, the sultan avoided the total destruction of his forces by evacuating the city and retreating with his army into the jungle, while most of his fleet was out at sea the time. Hence, he was able to rebuilt his city and continue harassing the navigation of Malacca after the Portuguese had left, and for that reason Dom Estevão was compelled to try and attack Ugentana once more. He departed from Malacca with a carrack, a number of light oarships, 400 Portuguese soldiers, 400 auxiliaries and an unrecorded number of combat slaves with arquebuses.

The Portuguese fleet suffered a storm sailing into the strait of Singapore, which sank Dom Estevaos galley. Having sailed up the Johor River, the Portuguese learned that the sultan had constructed a new stockade where a stone fort they destroyed the previous year had once stood, garrisoned by 5000 men, a short distance from his capital. However, the sultans forces were considerably weakened because the Portuguese had captured large amounts of artillery the previous year. Dom Estevão landed his men and attacked the stockade by land, the Portuguese sailors, Malay auxiliaries and slaves hurling clay bombs, which lit fires and threw the defenders into confusion. The soldiers then stormed it at the cry of Santiago! and captured it after a brief fight.

The Portuguese managed to capture the sultans fleet, numbering 40 lancharas that were beached at that location. The sultan witnessed the battle from atop an elephant, and again attempted to evacuate into the jungle, but he suffered a revolt and his baggage train carrying his treasure was assaulted mid-retreat by his own fleeing forces. Under these conditions, he sought terms with the Portuguese, but Dom Estevão only agreed to sign a peace treaty after the sultan provided his uncle as a valuable hostage.

With the capture of the Johor fleet, navigation in the strait of Singapore became much safer and trade increased.

See also
Portuguese Malacca
Capture of Malacca (1511)
Siege of Bintan
Battle of Ugentana
Siege of Johor (1587)

References 

Ugentana
Ugentana (1535)
Bintan
1526 in the Portuguese Empire
Portuguese Malacca
History of Malacca
Portuguese colonialism in Indonesia